Microbacterium lacus is a bacterium from the genus Microbacterium which has been isolated from sediments from the Shinji lake from the Shimane Prefecture in Japan. Microbacterium lacus has the ability to degrade sulfadiazine.

References

Further reading

External links
Type strain of Microbacterium lacus at BacDive -  the Bacterial Diversity Metadatabase	

Bacteria described in 2008
lacus